Men may refer to the following individuals:
Given name
Men Nguyen (born 1954), Vietnamese-American poker player

Surname
 Alexander Men (1935–1990), Soviet theologian, biblical scholar and writer
Mikhail Men (born 1960), Russian politician, son of Alexander
Men Sam An (born 1953), Cambodian politician